Trigonuropodidae is a family of mites in the order Mesostigmata.

Species
Trigonuropodidae contains one genus, with 80 recognized species:

 Genus Trigonuropoda Trägårdh, 1952
 Trigonuropoda adatoi Hirschmann & Hiramatsu, 1990       
 Trigonuropoda afoveolata Hirschmann, 1975       
 Trigonuropoda aokii Hiramatsu, 1982       
 Trigonuropoda cruzi Hirschmann & Hiramatsu, 1990       
 Trigonuropoda crucistructura Hirschmann, 1975       
 Trigonuropoda crucistructuraoides Hirschmann, 1975       
 Trigonuropoda crucistructurasimilis Hirschmann, 1975       
 Trigonuropoda cubaandrassyia Hirschmann, 1975       
 Trigonuropoda cubabaloghia Hirschmann, 1975       
 Trigonuropoda cubaborhidüa Hirschmann, 1975       
 Trigonuropoda cubaendrodyia Hirschmann, 1975       
 Trigonuropoda cubahutuae Hirschmann, 1975       
 Trigonuropoda cubakaszabia Hirschmann, 1975       
 Trigonuropoda cubaloksaia Hirschmann, 1975       
 Trigonuropoda cubamahunkaia Hirschmann, 1975       
 Trigonuropoda cubanicolaea Hirschmann, 1975       
 Trigonuropoda cubapecinaia Hirschmann, 1975       
 Trigonuropoda cubazicsiia Hirschmann, 1975       
 Trigonuropoda difoveolata Hirschmann, 1975       
 Trigonuropoda eustructura Hirschmann, 1975       
 Trigonuropoda fimbriata Hiramatsu, 1981       
 Trigonuropoda garciai Hirschmann & Hiramatsu, 1990       
 Trigonuropoda hutuae Hirschmann, 1975       
 Trigonuropoda ishikawai Hirschmann & Hiramatsu, 1990       
 Trigonuropoda latipilis Hirschmann, 1975       
 Trigonuropoda leytensis Hirschmann & Hiramatsu, 1990       
 Trigonuropoda luzonensis Hirschmann & Hiramatsu, 1990       
 Trigonuropoda magnaporula Hirschmann, 1975       
 Trigonuropoda magnatuberculata HirsghmÑNn, 1975       
 Trigonuropoda mindanaoensis Hirschmann & Hiramatsu, 1990       
 Trigonuropoda modesta Hiramatsu, 1982       
 Trigonuropoda monofoveolata Hirschmann, 1975       
 Trigonuropoda monofoveolatasimilis Hiramatsu, 1981       
 Trigonuropoda multitricha Hirschmann, 1975       
 Trigonuropoda munda Hiramatsu & Hirschmann, 1983       
 Trigonuropoda nodosa Hirschmann & Hiramatsu, 1990       
 Trigonuropoda nonpolyphemus Hirschmann, 1975       
 Trigonuropoda neotrifoveolata Hirschmann, 1975       
 Trigonuropoda octotricha Hirschmann, 1975       
 Trigonuropoda okinawaensis Hiramatsu, 1979       
 Trigonuropoda palawanensis Hirschmann & Hiramatsu, 1990       
 Trigonuropoda polyphemus (Vitzthum, 1935)       
 Trigonuropoda polypora Hirschmann, 1975       
 Trigonuropoda pontina Hirschmann, 1975       
 Trigonuropoda quadritricha Hirschmann, 1975       
 Trigonuropoda rarosae Hirschmann & Hiramatsu, 1990       
 Trigonuropoda reticulata Hirschmann & Hiramatsu, 1990       
 Trigonuropoda sanguinea Hiramatsu & Hirschmann, 1977       
 Trigonuropoda sanguineasimilis Hirschmann & Hiramatsu, 1990       
 Trigonuropoda shcherbakae Hirschmann, 1975       
 Trigonuropoda schizostructura Hirschmann, 1975       
 Trigonuropoda schizostructurasimilis Hirschmann, 1975       
 Trigonuropoda shibai Hiramatsu, 1980       
 Trigonuropoda structura Hirschmann, 1975       
 Trigonuropoda terraereginae Domrow, 1957       
 Trigonuropoda terraereginaesimilis Hirschmann, 1975       
 Trigonuropoda traegardhi Hirschmann, 1975       
 Trigonuropoda trichoandrassyia Hirschmann, 1975       
 Trigonuropoda trichobaloghia Hirschmann, 1975       
 Trigonuropoda trichobaloghiasimilis Hirschmann, 1975       
 Trigonuropoda trichohalaskovaaea Hirschmann, 1975       
 Trigonuropoda trichokaszabia Hirschmann, 1975       
 Trigonuropoda tricholoksaia Hirschmann, 1975       
 Trigonuropoda trichomahunkaia Hirschmann, 1975       
 Trigonuropoda trichonicolaea Hirschmann, 1975       
 Trigonuropoda trichopecinaia Hirschmann, 1975       
 Trigonuropoda trichopontina Hirschmann, 1975       
 Trigonuropoda trichoshcherbakaea Hirschmann, 1975       
 Trigonuropoda trichotuberculata Hirschmann, 1975       
 Trigonuropoda trichowoelkeia Hirschmann, 1975       
 Trigonuropoda trichozicsiia Hirschmann, 1975       
 Trigonuropoda trioculata Hirschmann, 1975       
 Trigonuropoda trioculatasimilis Hirschmann, 1975       
 Trigonuropoda trifoveolata Hirschmann, 1975       
 Trigonuropoda tuberculata Hirschmann, 1975       
 Trigonuropoda trichotuberculataoides Hirschmann, 1975       
 Trigonuropoda tuberculatasimilis Hiramatsu, 1979       
 Trigonuropoda tuberosa Hirschmann, 1975       
 Trigonuropoda tuberosasimilis Hirschmann, 1975       
 Trigonuropoda ulugurensis Hiramatsu, 1981

References

Mesostigmata
Acari families